Yolande Straughn (born 18 March 1968) is a Barbadian sprinter. She competed in the women's 200 metres at the 1988 Summer Olympics.

References

External links
 

1968 births
Living people
Athletes (track and field) at the 1987 Pan American Games
Athletes (track and field) at the 1988 Summer Olympics
Barbadian female sprinters
Olympic athletes of Barbados
Pan American Games competitors for Barbados
Place of birth missing (living people)
Olympic female sprinters